Kurti & Doyle are a British scriptwriting team comprising Richard Kurti and Bev Doyle. They're best known for their work on fantasy television series such as BBC One's  Robin Hood (2006), ITV1's Primeval (2007) and Sky 1's Sinbad (2012).

Career
Prior to their team up, Kurti directed short films and documentaries after training at the BBC. Beginning in 1995, Kurti & Doyle's work in independent British cinema led to a two-year writing contract with US studio Miramax. Following this they moved into television writing, starting with EastEnders and Eldorado, followed by a three-part adaptation of Robert Louis Stevenson’s novel Kidnapped, for BBC One.

Their two part BBC Sherlock Holmes drama Sherlock Holmes and the Baker Street Irregulars was produced by Andy Rowley for RDF Media (kids) and screened on BBC One in March 2007. They also wrote the two-part adaptation of Terry Pratchett's novel Going Postal for Sky 1 HD, and wrote the Tandem Communications/Syfy co-production The Lost Future, an action adventure TV movie set in a future that suffers from genetic regression.

They were to write a live-action version of Rudyard Kipling’s The Jungle Book for Pathé Films and the BBC, that was later reversioned for audio. Kurti & Doyle have written extensively for audio: for Big Finish Productions, they wrote a audio drama reboot of the iconic British science fiction comic Dan Dare and an adaptation of Ray Bradbury’s The Martian Chronicles, starring Derek Jacobi and Hayley Atwell. For Audible, they wrote the sci-fi thriller podcast The Effect.

Solo works
Independent of the partnership, Kurti has authored young adult novels. Monkey Wars was published in 2013 by Walker. The novel's plot focuses on two warring tribes of primates, the Langurs and the Rhesus. It was longlisted for the Carnegie Medal in 2014. Walker would then publish Maladapted in 2015. Doyle worked  on the 2019 BBC nature documentary Serengeti.

References

External links
 
 

20th-century English male writers
21st-century English male writers
21st-century British women writers
British dramatists and playwrights
British male screenwriters
British television writers
English television writers
English screenwriters
British male television writers
Screenwriting duos
British women television writers
20th-century women writers